Charles F. Craig (1905 – death date unknown) was an American Negro league pitcher in the 1920s.

A native of Martinsburg, West Virginia, Craig made his Negro leagues debut with the Lincoln Giants in 1926. He split time between the Lincoln club and the Harrisburg Giants the following season.

References

External links
 and Seamheads

Date of birth missing
Year of death missing
Place of death missing
Harrisburg Giants players
Lincoln Giants players
Baseball pitchers
Baseball players from West Virginia
Sportspeople from Martinsburg, West Virginia
1905 births